Bethel School District v. Fraser, 478 U.S. 675 (1986), was a landmark decision of the Supreme Court of the United States in which the Court upheld the suspension of a high school student who delivered a sexually suggestive speech at a school assembly. The case involved free speech in public schools.

On April 26, 1983, student Matthew Fraser was suspended from Bethel High School in Pierce County, Washington after he gave a speech including sexual innuendo at a school assembly while nominating a classmate for a student council position. Believing his speech to be inappropriate and vulgar, the school's administration suspended Fraser for three days and barred him from speaking at graduation. After unsuccessfully appealing his punishment through the school's grievance procedures, Fraser filed a lawsuit against the school board, claiming the suspension violated his right to free speech under the First Amendment to the U.S. Constitution.

The United States District Court and Ninth Circuit Court of Appeals both sided with Fraser. On appeal to the U.S. Supreme Court, a 7–2 majority held that his suspension did not violate the First Amendment. Writing for the majority, Chief Justice Warren Burger found that schools have the right to suppress student speech that is considered lewd or indecent, even if not obscene, in the interest of preserving a safe educational environment.

Background
On April 26, 1983, Matthew Fraser, a high school senior at Bethel High School in Spanaway, Washington, gave a speech nominating classmate Jeff Kuhlman for student council vice president. The speech was delivered at an assembly held during school hours and students were required to either attend or report to study hall. To an audience of about 600 students, including many 14-year-olds, Fraser gave the following speech:

It took Fraser about one minute to deliver the speech. As he delivered it, some students in the audience "hooted and yelled", while others appeared "bewildered and embarrassed". Fraser's candidate, Jeff Kuhlman, ultimately won the election with 90% of the vote.

While the speech was not outwardly obscene, Fraser made frequent use of sexual innuendos, metaphors, and double entendre, prompting disciplinary action from the administration. Prior to delivering the speech, two of Fraser's teachers warned him that the speech was "inappropriate", and that he "probably should not deliver it" because doing so could have "severe consequences". After appealing through the grievance procedures of his school, he was still found to be in violation of several school policies against disruptive behavior and the use of vulgar and offensive speech. These grounds later evolved to include obscenity at trial, but obscenity, according to Fraser, was not listed as grounds for his punishment in his initial hearing with school vice-principal Christy Blair. As a result, Fraser was suspended from school for three days, though he returned after two, and was prohibited from speaking at his graduation ceremony.  Fraser nonetheless was selected by a write-in vote which placed him second overall among the top three finishers, although Bethel High School administrators refused to accept the write-in vote as a valid result, and continued to deny Fraser the opportunity to speak at graduation.

With approval from his parents and help from American Civil Liberties Union cooperating attorney Jeff Haley, Fraser filed a lawsuit against the school authorities claiming a violation of his First Amendment right to free speech, and United States District Court judge Jack Tanner ruled in his favor.

The school district then appealed to the US Ninth Circuit Court of Appeals, which ruled in Fraser's favor with a broadly worded opinion. The school district asked the United States Supreme Court to consider the case. The Supreme Court granted certiorari on October 8, 1985.

Opinion of the Court
The Supreme Court reversed the Court of Appeals in a 7–2 vote to reinstate the suspension, saying that the school district's policy did not violate the First Amendment. Chief Justice Warren Burger delivered the Court's opinion, in what ended up along with the Gramm–Rudman decision (Bowsher v. Synar) to be the final case of the Burger Court era. Justices William J. Brennan and Harry Blackmun delivered concurring opinions, while Thurgood Marshall and John Paul Stevens dissented.

Though the Court distinguished its 1969 decision Tinker v. Des Moines, which upheld the right of students to express themselves where their words (or in that case, the wearing of a protest armband) are non-disruptive and could not be seen as connected with the school, Fraser limits the scope of that ruling, by prohibiting certain styles of expression that are sexually vulgar.

See also

 School speech
 Tinker v. Des Moines Independent Community School District, 393 U.S. 503 (1969)
 Hazelwood School District v. Kuhlmeier, 484 U.S. 260 (1988)
 Morse v. Frederick, 551 U.S. 393 (2007)
 Mahanoy Area School District v. B.L., 594 U.S. ___ (2021)
 List of United States Supreme Court cases
 List of United States Supreme Court cases, volume 478
 List of United States Supreme Court cases involving the First Amendment

References

 References

 Sources
 Bethel School District v. Fraser, 478 U.S. 675 (1986)

Further reading
 Finkelman, P., & Urofsky, M. I. (2003). Bethel School District No. 403 v. Fraser. In Landmark decisions of the United States Supreme Court. Washington: CQ Press. Retrieved January 22, 2009, from CQ Press Electronic Library, CQ Supreme Court Collection, http://library.cqpress.com/scc/lndmrk03-113-6442-349542. Document ID: lndmrk03-113-6442-349542.

External links
 
 

United States Supreme Court cases
United States Free Speech Clause case law
1986 in United States case law
Student rights case law in the United States
United States Supreme Court cases of the Burger Court
1986 in education
Education in Pierce County, Washington
History of Pierce County, Washington
United States obscenity case law
Obscenity controversies